Mary Wambui is a Kenyan businesswoman and politician. She succeeded former president Mwai Kibaki as the member of parliament for Othaya and served for only one term (2013-2017).

She is alleged to be Kibaki's second wife.  The Wambui family claim that Mwai married Mary in 1972 under Kikuyu customary law and that the two have a daughter, Wangui Mwai. In 2004 the media reported that Kibaki has a second spouse allegedly married under customary law, Mary Wambui, and a daughter, Wangui Mwai. After the news broke, the State House released an unsigned statement that Kibaki's only immediate family is his wife, Lucy and their four children.  The Washington Post termed the entire scandal as a "new Kenyan soap opera". In 2009, Kibaki, accompanied by  a furious Lucy Kibaki, held a press conference to re-state to the world that he only has one wife.

In an interview with The Standard written on April 5, 2007, Winnie said that she and Artur Margaryan, a suspected mercenary from Armenia, intended to get married in the future.

At a recent interview with the media in Kenya, Wambui said that she had five children but was reluctant to disclose their names.

References

Kenyan businesspeople
Year of birth missing (living people)
Living people